9D or 9-D can refer to:

IATA code for Toumaï Air Tchad
New York State Route 9D
Kepler-9d, an extrasolar planet orbiting the star Kepler-9
SSH 9D, alternate designation for Washington State Route 108
Navy AIM-9D/G/H, designation for the AIM-9 Sidewinder
Orion 9D, a model of Lockheed Model 9 Orion aircraft
Yak-9D, a model of Soviet Yakovlev Yak-9
GCR Class 9D, a class of British 0-6-0 steam locomotive

See also
D9 (disambiguation)